The Evangeline Hotel is a historic hotel and restaurant building located at 302 and 302A Jefferson Street in Lafayette, Louisiana.

Built in 1928, the hotel is a large six story brick building with a one-story restaurant wing in Italianate style.

The building was listed on the National Register of Historic Places on March 17, 1994.

See also
 National Register of Historic Places listings in Lafayette Parish, Louisiana

References

Hotel buildings on the National Register of Historic Places in Louisiana
Italianate architecture in Louisiana
Hotel buildings completed in 1928
Lafayette Parish, Louisiana
National Register of Historic Places in Lafayette Parish, Louisiana